WNRG-LP (107.9 FM, "Energy 107.9") was a radio station licensed to serve Palm Bay, Florida, United States.  The station was owned by Public Radio Information Services of Central Florida, Inc, and aired a dance music format, but since March 31, 2013, has been silent and its database deleted by the FCC.

History

This station received its original construction permit from the Federal Communications Commission on June 4, 2004.  The new station was assigned the call letters WGRV-LP by the FCC on August 10, 2004.  WGRV-LP has applied for its license to cover and that application was accepted by the FCC on November 18, 2005. The station was assigned the WNRG-LP call sign by the Federal Communications Commission on August 21, 2008.

Since March 2013, WNRG-LP has been off the air and its studios and request phone lines were disconnected. The station's license was cancelled by the FCC on January 27, 2014.

References

External links
 
WNRG-LP service area per the FCC database

NRG-LP
NRG-LP
Radio stations established in 2005
Radio stations disestablished in 2013
Defunct radio stations in the United States
Palm Bay, Florida
2005 establishments in Florida
2013 disestablishments in Florida
NRG-LP